The 1935 Milan–San Remo was the 28th edition of the Milan–San Remo cycle race and was held on 17 March 1935. The race started in Milan and finished in San Remo. The race was won by Giuseppe Olmo.

General classification

References

1935
1935 in road cycling
1935 in Italian sport
March 1935 sports events